Bukva is a village in the municipality of Kreševo, Bosnia and Herzegovina.

Demographics 
According to the 2013 census, its population was 99.

References

Populated places in Kreševo